Fraxetin is an O-methylated coumarin. It can be found in Fraxinus rhynchophylla and seeds of Datura stramonium. Fraxin is a glucoside of fraxetin.

References 

O-methylated coumarins
Catechols